Nicolás Ladislao Fedor Flores (born 19 August 1985), commonly known as Miku, is a Venezuelan professional footballer who plays as a striker for Primera División RFEF club CF Intercity.

He spent most of his career in Spain, having played for a host of clubs and starting with Valencia. In La Liga, he also represented Getafe and Rayo Vallecano, and won a Scottish double while on loan at Celtic in 2013.

Miku represented Venezuela in two Copa América tournaments.

Early years
The son of a Hungarian father and a Venezuelan mother, Miku was born in Caracas and received his nickname after Miklós, the equivalent of his first name in the Hungarian language.

Club career

Valencia
Having arrived in Valencia CF's youth system in 2001, Miku turned professional three years later, going on to serve five consecutive loans afterwards in both the second and third divisions.

On 27 August 2009, having returned to the Che after a strong season with UD Salamanca (finishing as joint-fifth in the goal charts), he scored a hat-trick in a 4–1 home win against Stabæk Fotball in the play-off round of the UEFA Europa League.

Getafe
However, clearly deemed surplus to requirements at Valencia – only third or fourth-choice striker – Miku was sold in January 2010 to Getafe CF, signing a -year deal. He scored on his debut, a 2–1 away victory over RCD Mallorca in the quarter-finals of the Copa del Rey, as a second-half substitute.

Benefitting from the absence of first-choice Roberto Soldado due to injury, Miku began appearing regularly as a starter. On 28 March 2010 he netted twice in a 3–1 win at Deportivo de La Coruña, adding another brace three rounds later, in a 3–0 home defeat of Villarreal CF also in La Liga.

Miku started the 2011–12 season as first choice, over veteran Dani Güiza and Adrián Colunga. He scored three goals in his first two league games, against Levante UD (1–1 home draw) and Real Madrid (4–2 away loss), and ended the campaign with 12 goals, best in the squad.

On 31 August 2012, the last day of the summer transfer window, Miku moved on loan to Celtic. He appeared in only 14 competitive matches during the season, and told Venezuelan media that he regretted his decision to join the Hoops; one highlight of his time at Celtic Park was playing the full 90 minutes as they defeated FC Barcelona 2–1 in the group stage of the UEFA Champions League.

Al-Gharafa
On 30 September 2013, Miku joined Qatar Stars League side Al-Gharafa SC for an undisclosed fee. He scored five goals in 15 games in his debut campaign, in an eventual ninth-place finish out of 14 teams.

Rayo
Miku returned to Spain on 2 February 2015, signing a two-and-a-half-year deal with Rayo Vallecano. On 12 February 2016, after contributing to a 2–2 away draw against Sporting de Gijón, he became the first Venezuelan to score in four consecutive Spanish top flight matchdays; he was named February's La Liga Player of the Month for this feat.

Bengaluru
In August 2017, 32-year-old Miku joined Indian Super League franchise Bengaluru FC on a two-year contract. He scored his first goal for them on 26 November in a 4–1 rout of Delhi Dynamos FC, adding three braces in his first season, against FC Goa in a 4–3 away defeat, FC Pune City (3–1, away) and Kerala Blasters FC (3–1, also away).

In the 2018–19 season, Miku and his team won the competition after a 1–0 extra time defeat of Goa in the final.

Later years
On 20 August 2019, Cypriot First Division club AC Omonia announced the signing of Miku for one year. He returned to Spain on 25 September 2020, after agreeing to a contract with Deportivo La Coruña, recently relegated to the third tier.

International career
Miku made his debut with Venezuela on 16 August 2006, in a 0–0 friendly with Honduras. Later, he was an important member of the squads that competed in the 2010 FIFA World Cup qualifiers, scoring in a 2–0 home victory against Colombia on 31 March 2009.

On 9 September 2009, Miku netted twice in a 3–1 home win over Peru; this brought Venezuela closer to its first-ever FIFA World Cup qualification, which eventually did not happen. He represented the nation at the 2011 Copa América, scoring in a 3–3 draw against Paraguay, helping his team to the second place in the group stage and an eventual fourth-place finish.

Four years later, in the next edition of the competition in Chile, Miku scored an 84th-minute goal in a 2–1 defeat to Brazil; a win would have sent his country through, but instead they were eliminated in last place in their group. Later that year, he was among 15 national players who threatened to quit the team after the president of the Venezuelan Football Federation accused them of conspiring to get the manager sacked.

Career statistics

Club

International

Scores and results list Venezuela's goal tally first, score column indicates score after each Miku goal.

Honours
Celtic
Scottish Premier League: 2012–13
Scottish Cup: 2012–13

Bengaluru
Indian Super League: 2018–19
Indian Super Cup: 2018

References

External links

1985 births
Living people
Venezuelan people of Hungarian descent
Venezuelan footballers
Footballers from Caracas
Association football forwards
La Liga players
Segunda División players
Segunda División B players
Primera Federación players
CD Alcoyano footballers
UD Salamanca players
Ciudad de Murcia footballers
Valencia CF Mestalla footballers
Gimnàstic de Tarragona footballers
Valencia CF players
Getafe CF footballers
Rayo Vallecano players
Deportivo de La Coruña players
Real Murcia players
CF Intercity players
Scottish Premier League players
Celtic F.C. players
Qatar Stars League players
Al-Gharafa SC players
Indian Super League players
Bengaluru FC players
Cypriot First Division players
AC Omonia players
Venezuela international footballers
2011 Copa América players
2015 Copa América players
Competitors at the 2006 Central American and Caribbean Games
Central American and Caribbean Games medalists in football
Central American and Caribbean Games silver medalists for Venezuela
Venezuelan expatriate footballers
Expatriate footballers in Spain
Expatriate footballers in Scotland
Expatriate footballers in Qatar
Expatriate footballers in India
Expatriate footballers in Cyprus
Venezuelan expatriate sportspeople in Spain
Venezuelan expatriate sportspeople in Scotland
Venezuelan expatriate sportspeople in Qatar
Venezuelan expatriate sportspeople in India
Venezuelan expatriate sportspeople in Cyprus